Fikrat Huseyn oglu Yusifov (born August 20, 1957) is an Azerbaijani economist who served as the Minister of Finance of the Republic of Azerbaijan.

Early life
Fikrat Yusifov was born in Sharur, Nakhchivan. He graduated with Honorary diploma in Economics from Azerbaijan State Institute of National Economy (now Azerbaijan State Economic University) named after Dadash Bunyadzade in 1978. In 1987 he received an Academic degree of Candidate of Economic Sciences in Moscow. He worked as an economist, chief of budget department in the Ministry of Finance.

References

Living people
1957 births
20th-century Azerbaijani economists
Finance ministers of Azerbaijan
21st-century Azerbaijani economists